The Turkish Airlines Ladies Open was a professional golf tournament on the Ladies European Tour that was held at the National Golf Club in Belek, Antalya, Turkey. It was first played in 2008 but was cancelled the following year due to lack of sponsorship. It returned to the schedule in 2010 with Turkish Airlines sponsorship.

Winners

References

External links

Coverage on the Ladies European Tour's official site

Former Ladies European Tour events
Golf tournaments in Turkey